Gringo is a 2018 crime comedy film directed by Nash Edgerton and written by Anthony Tambakis and Matthew Stone. The film stars David Oyelowo, Charlize Theron (who also produced), Joel Edgerton (Nash's brother), Amanda Seyfried, Thandiwe Newton, and Sharlto Copley, and follows a mild-mannered businessman who is sent to Mexico to deliver an experimental marijuana pill. When he is kidnapped by a drug cartel, he must escape alongside a hired mercenary. The film was co-produced between the United States and Australia.

The film was released in the United States on March 9, 2018, by Amazon Studios and STXfilms.

Plot 
In the Chicago offices of Promethium Pharmaceuticals, co-presidents Richard Rusk and Elaine Markinson receive a call from a company employee, Harold Soyinka, who claims he has been kidnapped in Mexico and that his abductors are demanding a ransom of five million US dollars.

One day earlier, Harold, Richard, and Elaine arrive in Mexico where they meet Sanchez, head of Promethium's Mexico plant. Unbeknownst to Harold, it is revealed that Sanchez has been selling Promethium's latest product, medical marijuana in the shape of a pill, to a Mexican cartel. Promethium has decided to cut them off to avoid harming their upcoming merger. Later that evening, as Richard, Elaine and Harold have dinner, Harold secretly records Richard's and Elaine's conversations while he is away from the table. He learns from the recording the merger plans, which would result in Harold losing his job. That night, he also discovers that his wife is having an affair and wants a divorce. Sanchez informs cartel leader Villegas about them getting cut off by Promethium; Villegas maims Sanchez and, believing that Harold is Promethium's boss, orders his capture.

Richard and Elaine leave Mexico the next morning without Harold when he seemingly disappears. Harold, hiding away at a motel, convinces the motel's operators, brothers Ronaldo and Ernesto to pose as kidnappers in an extortion plan in which he calls Richard pretending to be kidnapped in exchange for a hefty ransom. Richard calls his former-mercenary-turned-humanitarian brother Mitch to rescue Harold.

Harold spends the evening at a bar, believing his scheme to have failed. The bartender alerts the cartel when he recognizes Harold. Two men arrive and kidnap Harold, but, while delivering him to Villegas, Harold overpowers them and crashes the car.

The next morning, Harold is rescued by tourists Sunny and Miles, the latter of whom is working as a drug mule. The two take Harold back to Ronaldo and Ernesto's motel where all three had been staying, where Sunny befriends him. Soon, Ronaldo and Ernesto, who have been bribed by the cartel into helping them, attempt to kidnap Harold. However, Mitch arrives, defeats the brothers, and takes Harold with him. Mitch takes Harold to the airport to return him to Chicago, but he runs away. Mitch subdues Harold and injects him with a tracker to know where he is at all times. The men get on good terms with one another and devise a scheme to extort Richard for more money. When Mitch calls Richard to make that deal, Richard tells him that the company is planning to collect a large life insurance claim on Harold if he were to die, part of which Mitch would receive. Mitch reluctantly agrees to kill Harold.

Harold and Mitch are spotted by Ronaldo and Ernesto on the streets. Mitch prepares to shoot Harold but cannot bring himself to do so as he has grown fond of him. The two are then attacked by the brothers, who kidnap Harold and take him to Villegas. Villegas kills the brothers and orders Harold to access a vault at the Promethium plant in order to steal the marijuana pill formula. There, a shootout occurs when the police arrive.

During the battle, "Angel", Harold's Mexican colleague and one of Villegas' men, whisks Harold away from the fight and reveals himself as an undercover DEA agent. They are chased by members of the cartel, who run them off the road. Harold saves "Angel" from being killed by a cartel member; as Harold is about to be executed by another cartel member, Mitch arrives and saves him only to be killed by the first cartel member, whom Harold finishes off. Harold asks "Angel" for help, believing that he has nothing to return to in Chicago. "Angel" agrees to make a false declaration Harold dead and Harold gives him company files incriminating Richard before leaving.

Villegas, his men, and Miles the drug mule are arrested by Mexican police, aided by "Angel". Richard is arrested by the DEA and imprisoned, and Elaine, who testified against Richard, takes over Promethium. Sanchez, despite his disability, settles down happily with his children. Harold, living quietly as "Harry Barnes," stays in Mexico, opens a beachside bar, and remains in contact with Sunny.

Cast 

David Oyelowo as Harold “Harry” Soyinka
Joel Edgerton as Richard Rusk
Charlize Theron as Elaine Markinson
Thandiwe Newton as Bonnie Soyinka
Sharlto Copley as Mitch Rusk
Harry Treadaway as Miles
Amanda Seyfried as Sunny
Carlos Corona as Juan Miguel “Pantera Negra” Villegas (Black Panther)
Hernán Mendoza as Celerino Sanchez
Diego Cataño as Ronaldo Gonzalez
Rodrigo Corea as Ernesto Gonzalez
Yul Vazquez as Angel Valverde
Paris Jackson as Nelly
Alan Ruck as Jerry
Kenneth Choi as Marty
Melonie Diaz as Mia
Hector Kotsifakis as Roberto Vega
Bashir Salahuddin as Stu
Bill Maher as himself
Harrison Jones as UNICEF Volunteer

Production 
On May 12, 2014, Charlize Theron joined the cast of the film, then titled American Express. On December 10, 2015, David Oyelowo, Amanda Seyfried and Joel Edgerton joined the cast of the film. On March 11, 2016, Thandiwe Newton, Kenneth Choi, Harry Treadaway, Michael Angarano and Yul Vazquez joined the cast of the film. On May 11, 2016, STX Entertainment acquired distribution rights to the film. Principal photography began on March 7, 2016.

Release 
The film was released on March 9, 2018, by Amazon Studios and STXfilms.

Box office 
Gringo has grossed $5 million in the United States and Canada, and $6 million in other territories, for a worldwide total of $11 million.

In the United States and Canada, Gringo was released alongside The Hurricane Heist, The Strangers: Prey at Night and A Wrinkle in Time, and was projected to gross around $5 million from 2,404 theaters in its opening weekend. However, after making just $997,000 on its first day, weekend estimates were lowered to $3 million. It ended up debuting to $2.6 million, finishing 11th at the box office, and marking the 27th worst wide opening of all-time. In its second weekend the film dropped 76% to $630,000, finishing in 17th and marking the 25th worst 2nd weekend drop in history. In its third weekend the film was pulled from 2,197 theaters (94.1%, the 21st worst such drop all-time) and grossed just $36,241.

Critical response 
The website's critical consensus reads, "Gringo rounds up a bafflingly overqualified cast for a misfire of a comedy that's fatally undermined by its messy plot, poorly conceived characters, and obvious debts to better films." On Metacritic, the film has a weighted average score of 46 out of 100, based on 33 critics, indicating "mixed or average reviews". Audiences polled by CinemaScore gave the film an average grade of "C+" on an A+ to F scale.

References

External links 
 
 

2018 films
2018 crime films
2018 comedy films
Amazon Studios films
STX Entertainment films
American films about cannabis
Films scored by Christophe Beck
Films produced by Charlize Theron
Films set in Chicago
Films set in Mexico City
American crime comedy films
Films about Mexican drug cartels
2010s English-language films
Films directed by Nash Edgerton
2010s American films
2010s Mexican films